Aglaspis is the type genus of the family Aglaspididae within the arthropod order Aglaspidida.  It lived on the seafloor in what is now Wisconsin during late Cambrian times.

References

External links
 Aglaspis at the Paleobiology Database

Aglaspidida
Fossils of the United States